Dame-Marie is a commune in the Orne department in north-western France populated by 170 inhabitants.

See also
Communes of the Orne department

References
 

Damemarie